Helena Unierzyska née Matejko (6 April 1867 – 11 October 1932), was a Polish painter and sculptor, daughter of Poland's national painter Jan Matejko and his wife Teodora Giebułtowska who often posed for his paintings. His daughter Helena (one of their five children) is best remembered as the live model for a series of her father's symbolic portraits of girls, and less as an aspiring artist.

Biography
During her infancy she lived with her parents in Krzesławice, a suburb of Kraków. She was very sickly when she was a child. Helena often assisted her father in his painting trips and in his daily studio sessions. On 24 June 1891 she married one of her father's students from the Academy of Fine Arts, painter Józef Unierzyski. Notably, her own mother disapproved of the match and did not attend the wedding ceremony.

After the wedding they went to live in Boleń, a village near Kraków. They had no children of their own, but she adopted children from the village. Helena was a patriot. She had helped Polish victims in World War I and was awarded the Cross of Independence by president Stanisław Wojciechowski in the interwar period.

References

Further reading
 Serafińska S., Jan Matejko. Wspomnienia rodzinne, Wydawnictwo Literackie, Kraków 1958.

External links

 Helena Matejko
 

1867 births
1932 deaths
Burials at Rakowicki Cemetery
Matejko family
19th-century Polish painters
20th-century Polish painters
Polish sculptors
Polish artists' models
20th-century sculptors
19th-century sculptors
Polish women painters
19th-century Polish women artists
20th-century Polish women artists
Models from Kraków